Line 2 of the Athens Metro runs entirely underground from  in the northwest to  in the south, via .

On 6 April 2013, Line 2 was extended to Anthoupoli in the north west, and on 26 July 2013 to Elliniko to the south.

Future extensions 

According to the Athens Metro Development Plan of September 2022, Attiko Metro (who develops and builds Metro extensions) is exploring extensions to both ends of Line 2.

Northern extension 

Southern extension 

Stations 

The spelling of the station names on this table, in English and Greek, are according to the signage. All Line 2 stations, except for Agios Dimitrios, have two tracks and two side platforms: Agios Dimitrios has an island platform layout.

Notes

References

External links 

Athens Metro official website

Athens Metro lines
Railway lines opened in 2000
2000 establishments in Greece